Lincoln School, also known as the W.J. McGee Boyhood School, is a historic building located north of Farley, Iowa, United States.  This is a typical Iowa one-room schoolhouse that features frame construction, rectangular shape, and a gable roof.  The entryway on the front was added in the 1890s.  The building is historically significant with its association with W.J. McGee, a respected inventor, geologist, anthropologist, and ethnologist.  While he was largely self-taught, McGee attended school here during the four winter months from about 1858 to 1867.  The building was listed on the National Register of Historic Places in 1975.

References

One-room schoolhouses in Iowa
Buildings and structures in Dubuque County, Iowa
National Register of Historic Places in Dubuque County, Iowa
School buildings on the National Register of Historic Places in Iowa